Miriam Harris may refer to:
Miriam Coles Harris (1834–1925), American novelist
Miriam Goldberg (1916–2017 as Harris), American newspaper publisher
Miriam Duchess Harris, African American academic, author, and legal scholar
Miriam Harris, British politician, candidate in Solihull Metropolitan Borough Council election, 1986 and Solihull Metropolitan Borough Council election, 1988
Miriam Harris Murray JP of Dunedin in 1995 Birthday Honours
Miriam Harris, experimental film maker in 2009 Brooklyn Film Festival and contributor to 2016 comics anthology Three Words
Miriam Harris, character in 2013 American comedy film Last Vegas